Ernst Constantin Veberman (also Weberman(n); 14 March 1885 Haljala Parish, Wierland County – 21 December 1940 Tallinn) was an Estonian politician. He was a member of the II Riigikogu, representing the National Liberal Party.

1925–26 he was Minister of Commerce and Industry. In 1940 he was arrested by the NKVD. He committed suicide while under arrest.

References

1885 births
1940 deaths
People from Haljala Parish
People from Kreis Wierland 
National Liberal Party (Estonia) politicians
Government ministers of Estonia
Members of the Riigikogu, 1923–1926
Suicides in Estonia
Estonian politicians who committed suicide
Estonian people who died in Soviet detention